Caurinus dectes is a species of snow scorpionfly in the family Boreidae. It is found in North America.

References

Further reading

 

Snow scorpionflies
Articles created by Qbugbot
Insects described in 1979
Insects of North America